Aminophenol may refer to any of three isomeric chemical compounds:

 2-Aminophenol
 3-Aminophenol
 4-Aminophenol

They are simultaneously an aniline and a phenol.

Aminophenols